Pueblo Transit is the public transportation operator for the metro area of Pueblo, Colorado. Formed in 1971 after a previous public-private transportation alliance went bankrupt, the agency provides eleven routes. In 2008, the organization made it so all buses were equipped with electronic fare collection boxes, which are designed to encourage more ridership by avoiding the exact-fare requirement of most transit systems.

Route list
1 Eastside
2 Bessemer
3 Irving Place
4 Berkeley/Beulah
6 Pueblo Mall
7 Highland Park
8 Hwy 50 West
9 University
10 Belmont
11 Red Creek
12 Lake Ave

References

Pueblo, Colorado
Bus transportation in Colorado
Transit agencies in Colorado